A  is one of the traditionally made Japanese swords (nihonto) that were worn by the samurai class of feudal Japan. The tantō dates to the Heian period, when it was mainly used as a weapon but evolved in design over the years to become more ornate. Tantō were used in traditional martial arts (tantojutsu).  The term has seen a resurgence in the West since the 1980s as a point style of modern tactical knives, designed for piercing or stabbing.

Description

The tantō is a single or double edged dagger with a length between 15 and 30 cm (1 Japanese shaku). The tantō was designed primarily as a stabbing weapon, but the edge can be used for slashing as well.
Tantō are generally forged in hira-zukuri (平造) style (without ridgeline), meaning that their sides have no ridge line and are nearly flat, unlike the shinogi-zukuri (鎬造) structure of a katana. Some tantō have particularly thick cross-sections for armor-piercing duty, and are called yoroi toshi.

Tantō were mostly carried by samurai; commoners did not generally wear them. Women sometimes carried a small tantō called a kaiken in their obi primarily for self-defense. Tantō were sometimes worn as the shōtō (小刀) in place of a wakizashi in a daishō, especially on the battlefield. Before the advent of the wakizashi/tantō combination, it was common for a samurai to carry a tachi and a tantō as opposed to a katana and a wakizashi.

It has been noted that the tachi would be paired with a tantō and later the katana would be paired with another shorter katana. With the advent of the katana, the wakizashi eventually was chosen by samurai as the short sword over the tantō. Kanzan Satō in his book The Japanese Sword notes that there did not seem to be any particular need for the wakizashi and suggests that the wakizashi may have become more popular than the tantō due to the wakizashi being more suited for indoor fighting. He mentions the custom of leaving the katana at the door of a castle or palace when entering while continuing to wear the wakizashi inside.

History of tantō in Japan
The production of swords in Japan is divided into specific time periods:
 Jōkotō (ancient swords, until around 900 A.D.)
 Kotō (old swords from around 900–1596)
 Shintō (new swords 1596–1780)
 Shinshintō (new new swords 1781–1876)
 Gendaitō (modern swords 1876–1945)
 Shinsakutō (newly made swords 1953–present)

Heian to Muromachi

The tantō was invented partway through the Heian period. With the beginning of the Kamakura period, tantō were forged to be more aesthetically pleasing, and hira and uchi-sori tantō becoming the most popular styles. Near the middle of the Kamakura period, more tantō artisans were seen, increasing the abundance of the weapon, and the kanmuri-otoshi style became prevalent in the cities of Kyoto and Yamato. Because of the style introduced by the tachi in the late Kamakura period, tantō began to be forged longer and wider. The introduction of the Hachiman faith became visible in the carvings in the hilts around this time. The hamon (line of temper) is similar to that of the tachi, except for the absence of choji-midare, which is nioi and utsuri. Gunomi-midare and suguha are found to have taken its place.

During the era of the Northern and Southern Courts, the tantō were forged to be up to forty centimeters as opposed to the normal one shaku (about thirty centimeters) length. The blades became thinner between the ura and the omote, and wider between the ha and mune. At this point in time, two styles of hamon were prevalent: the older style, which was subtle and artistic, and the newer, more popular style. With the beginning of the Muromachi period, constant fighting caused the mass production of blades, meaning that with higher demand, lower-quality blades were manufactured. Blades that were custom-forged still were of exceptional quality, but the average blade suffered greatly. As the end of the period neared, the average blade narrowed and the curvature shallowed.

Katana originates from sasuga (刺刀), a kind of tantō used by lower-ranking samurai who fought on foot in the Kamakura period. Their main weapon was a long naginata and sasuga was a spare weapon. In the Nanboku-chō period which corresponds to the early Muromachi period, long weapons such as ōdachi were popular, and along with this, sasuga lengthened and finally became katana.

Momoyama to the early Edo period

Approximately two hundred and fifty years of peace accompanied the unification of Japan, in which there was little need for blades. In this period, both the katana and wakizashi were invented, taking the place of the tantō and tachi as the most-used pair of weapons, and the number of tantō forged was severely decreased. Since this period, tantō have often been carved with splendid decorations. Of the tantō and wakizashi forged during this period, three masterpieces are called the Nihon santō (Three Blades in Japan).

Late Edo period

There were still a few tantō being forged during this period, and the ones that were forged reflected the work of the Kamakura, Nambokucho, or Muromachi eras. Suishinshi Masahide was a main contributor towards the forging of tantō during this age. There are now only prehistoric tantō being used in combat.

Meiji to present
Many tantō were forged before World War II, due to the restoration of the Emperor to power. Members of the Imperial Court began wearing the set of tachi and tantō once more, and the number of tantō in existence increased dramatically. After World War II, a restriction on sword forging caused tantō manufacture to fall very low.  American and European interest in Japanese martial arts since the war created a demand for the tantō outside Japan from the 1960s through the present time.

Types of tantō

Blade types

Hira (平): A very common tantō form with no shinogi, the edge bevels reaching all the way from the edge (ha) to the back (mune) with no separate flats in between, creating an almost triangular cross-section (the back is ridged, as on most other blade forms, so the cross-section is actually an extremely asymmetrical diamond shape; on shinogi zukuri blades it is hexagonal). It is extremely common due to the simplicity of its design.
Shinogi (鎬): This is the most common type of blade geometry for long swords, but tantō made in this form are very rare, usually created from cut-down blades when a longer sword has been broken. Shinogi means the central ridge that runs along the length of the blade between the edge bevels and the body of the blade.
Osoraku: Osoraku zukuri features an extremely long o-kissaki type point, over half the blade's length.
Shōbu (菖蒲): A common blade type that is very similar to the shinogi zukuri, except that it lacks a yokote, the distinct angle between the long cutting edge and the point section, and instead the edge curves smoothly and uninterrupted into the point.
Unokubi (鵜首): An uncommon tantō style akin to the kanmuri-otoshi, with a back that grows abruptly thinner around the middle of the blade, but in the unokubi zukuri it regains its thickness just before the point. There is normally a short, wide groove extending to the midway point on the blade.
Kanmuri-otoshi: These tantō were shaped in hira or shobu style but from about half way to the tip the back edge was sharpened though this second edge was not particularly sharp. They had a groove running halfway up the blade and were similar to the unokubi style tantō.
Kissaki-moroha (切先両刃): A rare blade type with a double-edged point. Unlike the later kanmuri-otoshi the tip had a distinct shape unlike any other tanto: the back edge would curve slightly downwards so that the point was lower than the back of the blade whereas other tanto had the point in line with the back of the blade. Often they had a wide groove in the base half. The most well known historical blade of this type is the tachi Kogarasu Maru, "Little Crow", one of the National Treasures of Japan.
Moroha (両刃): A rare, double-edged tantō type that has a diamond-shaped cross-section. The blade tapers to a point and contains a shinogi that runs to the point.
Yoroi tōshi or yoroi dōshi (鎧通し): tantō that have particularly thick cross-sections for armor-piercing duty.
Katakiriha (片切刃): An asymmetric tantō form, sharpened only on one side to create a chisel-shaped cross-section.
Kubikiri (首切り): A very rare type; the sharpened blade is on the inside curve rather than the outside. It has no sharpened point, making it difficult to use in battle and enshrouding the weapon in mystery. Kubikiri means "head cutter". According to one myth, they were carried by attendants of samurai for cutting off the heads of fallen enemies. There are other speculations existing about the kubikiri'''s possible uses. Perhaps they were used by doctors or carried by high-ranking officials as a badge is worn today. They could also have been used for cutting charcoal or incense, or used as an artistic tool for pruning bonsai trees.Hōchōgata (包丁形): A tantō form that is commonly described as a short, wide, hira. The hōchōgata ("kitchen knife-shaped") was one of the blade type that the legendary swordsmith Masamune favored.

Mountings (koshirae)Aikuchi (合口): The aikuchi is a tantō koshirae where the fuchi is flush with the mouth of the sheath. There is no handguard. Aikuchi normally have plain wooden hilts, and many forms of aikuchi have kashira that are made from animal horns.Hamidashi: The hamidashi is a tantō koshirae that features a small handguard.

Other tantōKaiken tantō: The kuaiken (also kwaiken or futokoro-gatana) is a generally short tantō that is commonly carried in aikuchi or shirasaya mounts. It was useful for self-defense indoors where the long katana and intermediate wakizashi were inconvenient. Women carried them in the obi for self-defense and rarely for jigai (ritual suicide). A woman received a kaiken as part of her wedding gifts.
Fan Tantō: The fan tantō is a common tantō with a blade entirely concealed within a fan-shaped scabbard. The blade was usually low quality, as this tantō was not designed to be a display piece, but rather a concealed weapon for self-defense.
Yari Tantō: Japanese spearheads were often altered so that it became possible to mount them as tantō. Unlike most blades, yari tantō had triangular cross-sections.
Ken tanto: This is also not truly a tantō, though it is often used and thought of as one. Ken were straight, double-edged blades often used for Buddhist rituals, and could be made from spearheads that were broken or cut shorter. They were often given as offerings from sword smiths when they visited a temple. The hilt of the ken tantō may be found made with a vajra (double thunderbolt related to Buddhism).Modern tantō: Modern tactical knives have been made by knife makers Bob Lum, Phill Hartsfield, Ernest Emerson, Allen Elishewitz, Bob Terzuola, Strider Knives, Harold J. "Kit" Carson, Benchmade, Camillus Cutlery Company, Spyderco, Severtech, Ka-Bar, SOG Knives, Columbia River Knife & Tool, and Cold Steel.  These "American Tantō" designs which are often folding knives, feature a thick spine on the blade that goes from the tang to the tip for increased tip strength. The handle shape may be altered slightly to provide better ergonomics.

Use in martial arts
Tantō with blunt wooden or blunt plastic blades are used to practice martial arts. Versions with a blunt metal blade are used in more advanced training and in demonstrations. Martial arts that employ the tantō include:

 Aikido
 Aikijutsu
 Jujutsu
 Wadō-ryū (both tanto and katana)
 Koryu Bujutsu
 Ninjutsu
 Shorinji Kempo
 Modern Arnis (taking place of dagger)

Popular cultureTeenage Mutant Ninja Turtles'' features tantō knives used by April O'Neil, Leonardo, and Splinter in the 2012 version, and also by the Shredder in the 1990 version and Karai in the 2003 version.

Gallery

See also
 List of daggers
 Fighting knife
 Japanese sword
 Kaiken (dagger)
 Yoroi-dōshi

References

External links

 Nihonto forum
 Japanese Sword Index and Visual Glossary 

Japanese sword types
Military knives
Japanese knives
Samurai swords
Blade weapons
Samurai weapons and equipment
Japanese swords